Sally Peers (born 1 June 1991) is an Australian former professional tennis player. Her career-high singles ranking by the Women's Tennis Association (WTA) is 145, which she achieved on 11 April 2011. Her highest doubles ranking of world No. 89 she reached on 8 November 2010. Her career high in juniors is world No. 54, achieved on 21 July 2008.

Early life and junior career
Her mother, Elizabeth Little, was a professional tennis player, as is her brother, John Peers. Sally Peers started playing tennis at the age of six. She attended Mount View Primary School in Glen Waverley and Korowa Anglican Girls' School.

In 2009, she won the girls' doubles tournament of the Wimbledon Championships, paired with Noppawan Lertcheewakarn of Thailand.

2010

In 2010, Peers attended the Commonwealth Games in New Delhi, India. She entered both singles and women's doubles. In the singles tournament, Peers was seeded fourth. She skipped the first round because she was seeded and was due to play Maldive player Aminta Mahir. Sally thrashed Mahir, 6–0, 6–0 advancing through to the quarterfinals. She then played seventh seed Anna Smith from the UK. Peers won 6–3, 6–3, and won through to the semifinals. This meant that no-matter what happened Peers would be in a play-off for a medal. She played fellow Australian and No. 1 seed Anastasia Rodionova. After losing the first set 3–6, Peers bounced back and took the second set in a tie-breaker. However, Rodionova powered through the third set 6–1, on her way to winning the gold medal. Peers was then in the bronze-medal match. She played another Australian and sixth seed Olivia Rogowska. Peers again lost the first set, and again came back in the second to win in a tie-breaker. However, she didn't make the same mistake as she did against Rodionova and won the bronze medal beating Rogowska, 4–6, 7–6, 6–3.

In the doubles event, Sally played with Anastasia Rodionova. As the No. 1 seeds they skipped the first round and played Bahama team, Nikkita Fountain and Larikah Russell in the quarterfinals. Rodionova and Peers powered through the match 6–2, 6–4. They reached the semifinals and played Indians and fourth seeds, Sania Mirza and Rushmi Chakravarthi. Peers and Rodionova won through to the gold-medal match, winning 6–4, 6–4 against fellow Australians Jessica Moore and Olivia Rogowska. Peers and Rodionova won the first set 6–3, but lost the second 2–6. In the third set, Peers and Rodionova won 6–3, and the gold medal.

At the US Open, she qualified to play in the main draw of a Grand Slam tournament for the first time. In the first round, she crushed world No. 54, Aleksandra Wozniak, 6–0, 6–1 for her first ever major victory before being defeated by the defending US Open champion, Kim Clijsters, in straight sets, 6–2, 6–1.

2011

Peers got her first win over a top 50 player at the Brisbane International where she received a wildcard. She defeated world No. 25, Alisa Kleybanova in the first round, 3–6, 6–4, 6–3 but then lost to Barbora Záhlavová-Strýcová in straight sets, 4–6, 1–6.

For the Australian Open, she earned a wildcard entry into the women's singles. In the first round she faced 25th seed and eventual quarterfinalist Petra Kvitová. Peers lost in straight sets, 2–6, 4–6.
She also entered 2011 Australian Open – Mixed doubles with Carsten Ball. In the first round, they played unseeded pair Monica Niculescu and Eric Butorac. Peers and Ball won in straight sets, 6–1, 6–2. In the second round, they were drawn to face No. 1 seeds Bob Bryan and Liezel Huber. Huber and Bryan pulled out of the match. Peers and Ball played Bethanie Mattek-Sands and Horia Tecău in the quarterfinals. Mattek-Sands and Tecau won the match in tough straight sets, 7–5, 6–4.

ITF Circuit finals

Singles: 7 (2–5)

Doubles: 29 (14–15)

References

External links

 
 
  (archive)

1991 births
Living people
Australian female tennis players
Sportswomen from Victoria (Australia)
Tennis players at the 2010 Commonwealth Games
Commonwealth Games gold medallists for Australia
Wimbledon junior champions
Grand Slam (tennis) champions in girls' doubles
Tennis players from Melbourne
Commonwealth Games bronze medallists for Australia
Commonwealth Games medallists in tennis
21st-century Australian women
Medallists at the 2010 Commonwealth Games